The University System of Maryland (USM) is a public higher education system in the U.S. state of Maryland. The system is composed of the eleven campuses at College Park, Baltimore County, Baltimore, Princess Anne, Towson, Salisbury, Bowie, Frostburg, Hagerstown, Rockville, Cambridge, and Adelphi, along with four regional higher education centers located throughout the state of Maryland.

History 

In 1974, Maryland, along with seven other states, mainly in the South, submitted plans to desegregate its state universities; Maryland's plans were approved by the U.S. Department of Health, Education and Welfare. The University System of Maryland was created in 1988 from the merger of University of Maryland (UM) and Board of Trustees of State Universities and Colleges (BTSUC).

Campuses

With more than 172,000 students at all levels, USM institutions award 78% of bachelor's degrees in Maryland.

Finances
Nearly 50 percent of undergraduates graduate without debt. USM institutions attract more than $1.4 billion in research and development funding to the state annually and have helped foster the creation of more than 700 startup companies since 2011. The system's Aa1 bond rating enables its institutions to borrow at lower costs to students, families and taxpayers. Related effectiveness and efficiency initiatives have saved Marylanders nearly $600 million in administrative costs since 2004.

Governance 
The USM is governed by a board of regents and led by a chancellor, who serves as the CEO of the university system and leads the USM Office.

USM Board of Regents

A 17-member volunteer Board of Regents, including one full-time student, governs the University System of Maryland. Appointed by the governor, the regents oversee the system's academic, administrative, and financial operations; formulate policy; and appoint the USM chancellor and the presidents of the system's 12 institutions. With the exception of the student member, each regent is appointed for a term of five years, and may not serve more than two consecutive terms. The student regent is appointed for a one-year term, and may be reappointed. Regents serve on the board without compensation.

USM chancellors
John S. Toll (1988–1990)
Donald Langenberg (1990–2002)
William E. Kirwan (2002–2015)
Robert L. Caret (2015–2020)
Jay A. Perman (2020–present)

USM Office 
The USM Office, led by the system chancellor, is the staff to the Board of Regents. Staff members advocate on behalf of the 12 USM institutions, facilitate collaboration and efficiencies among the institutions, and provide information about the system to the public.

With leadership from the USM Board of Regents and the chancellor, the system office coordinates academic programs, assists with long-range planning and resource management, facilitates private fund raising, and provides financial stewardship.

The system office is headquartered in Baltimore and has locations in Adelphi, Annapolis, and Columbia.

See also

 List of colleges and universities in Maryland

References

External links

Board of Regents records at the University of Maryland libraries

 
 
M
Educational institutions established in 1988
1988 establishments in Maryland

fi:Marylandin yliopisto